Kim Hyeok-jin (born 6 March 1991) is a South Korean footballer who plays as midfielder for Suwon FC in K League Challenge.

Career
He was selected by Suwon FC in the 2014 K League draft.

References

External links 

1991 births
Living people
Association football midfielders
South Korean footballers
Suwon FC players
K League 2 players
K League 1 players